The Escola Superior de Enfermagem de Coimbra (ESEnfC) is a public nursing school in Coimbra, Portugal.

History
It was created after the 2004 decree law Decreto-Lei nº 175/2004 de 21 de Julho through the merging of the two previous nursing schools of Coimbra: the Escola Superior de Enfermagem de Bissaya Barreto and the Escola Superior de Enfermagem Dr. Ângelo da Fonseca which were providing degrees since the 1990s, but whose origins as technical nursing and health training schools can be dated back to the early 20th century..

See also
List of colleges and universities in Portugal
Higher education in Portugal
Education in Coimbra

External links
Official site
 https://web.archive.org/web/20120525215523/http://www.esenfc.pt/site/

Education in Coimbra
Nursing schools in Portugal
Higher education in Portugal